Providence Township, Iowa may refer to one of the following places:

Providence Township, Buena Vista County, Iowa
Providence Township, Hardin County, Iowa

See also
Providence Township (disambiguation)

Iowa township disambiguation pages